36th Division or 36th Infantry Division may refer to:

Infantry divisions
 36th Division (German Empire)
 36th Infantry Division (Wehrmacht)
 36th Infantry Division Forlì, Italy
 36th Infantry Division (Poland)
 36th Rifle Division (Soviet Union)
 36th Guards Rifle Division, Soviet Union, fought in the Battle of Stalingrad
 36th (Ulster) Division, British Army, World War I
 36th Infantry Division (United Kingdom), World War II
 36th Infantry Division (United States)
36th Division (Imperial Japanese Army)

Cavalry divisions
 36th Division (National Revolutionary Army), Republic of China

Armoured divisions
 36th Division (Israel)
 36th Tank Division (Soviet Union), with 17th Mechanized Corps, June 1941

See also 
 36th Brigade (disambiguation)
 36th Regiment (disambiguation)
 36 Squadron (disambiguation)